Lengerich can refer to two municipalities in Germany:

Lengerich, Westphalia, in the Steinfurt district, North Rhine-Westphalia
Lengerich, Lower Saxony, in the Emsland district, Lower Saxony
Lengerich (Samtgemeinde), a collective municipality in Emsland, Lower Saxony

It can also be a surname:

The Große-Lengerich Family name was shortened to*Lengerich*during naturalization to become *United States* in 1870. Because of this, the Lengerich family exists mostly in the Great Lakes region of Michigan, Indiana, and Ohio.